Nikine is a village in Kabrousse, Diembéring, Oussouye, Ziguinchor, Casamance, Senegal; most residents are from the Fula people and the population is in decline.

Populated places in Ziguinchor Region